Cantao is a genus of true bugs in family Scutelleridae.

Description
Body elongate oval; head elongate, with nearly straight and carinate lateral margins; pronotum with posterolateral angles produced at base of scutellum; scutellum with a pair of deep foveae basally; peritreme large, occupying most of metapleurite, evaporatorium reduced.

Distribution
Distributed in the Indomalaya, the Wallacea, New Guinea and Australia. A doubtful species (Cantao africanus) has been reported from tropical Africa. A fossil species (tentatively placed into Cantao) was described from the middle Miocene of Tottori Prefecture, Honshu, Japan.

Species
 Cantao ocellatus (Thunberg, 1784)
 Cantao variabilis (Montrouzier, 1855) 
 Cantao purpuratus (Westwood, 1837)  
 Cantao parentum (White, 1839) 
 Cantao africanus Horváth, 1892
 † ?Cantao yamanai Fujiyama, 1967 (fossil)

References

Scutelleridae
Pentatomomorpha genera